The  1976-77 French Rugby Union Championship was won by  Béziers   beating Perpignan in the final.

Formula 
The "elite"  (group A) were formed by five pools of eight clubs.

Were 25 the teams of group A qualified for the knockout stages with seven team coming from group B, also formed by 40 teams.

Both group were arranged in 5 pools of 8 teams.

Qualification Round

Group A
In bold the clubs qualified for the next round. The teams are listed according to the final ranking

Group B 
The teams qualified are here listed:

Knockout stages

"Last 32" 
In bold the clubs qualified for the next round

"Last 16" 
In bold the clubs qualified for the next round

Quarter of finals 
In bold the clubs qualified for the next round

Semifinals

Final 

Béziers won le Bouclier de Brennus for the fifth time in the '70s.

Three players in the match were also members of the French team that won Grand Slam in 1977 with "équipe de France" : Alain Paco and Michel Palmié of Béziers and Jean-François Imbernon of USAP.

External links 
 Compte rendu finale de 1977 lnr.fr

1977
France
Championship